Hellier is an unincorporated community and coal town in Pike County, Kentucky, United States.

History
A post office was established in the community in 1906, and named for Ralph Augustus Hellier, the head of a Pike County coal mining company.

Notable people
Vern Bickford, baseball player, was born in Hellier.

References

Unincorporated communities in Pike County, Kentucky
Unincorporated communities in Kentucky
Coal towns in Kentucky